The Fugitive is a 1910 American drama film directed by  D. W. Griffith. Prints of the film survive at the film archive of the Library of Congress and at George Eastman House. The script was by John MacDonagh, who would later fight in the Easter Rising under the command of his brother, Thomas MacDonagh, one of the seven signatories of the Proclamation of the Irish Republic, who would be executed by the British along with 15 other leaders after the Rising.

John MacDonagh's script was originally on an Orange/Green theme, and set in Ireland where unionists and nationalists were at war, rather than the American Civil War theme to which it was adapted. The plot involves two soldiers, one Confederate and one Union, who leave their families to go to war. After a skirmish they end up separated from their own sides; the Union soldier shoots the Confederate. Escaping from pursuing Confederates, he looks for refuge in the house of his enemy's family.

Cast
 Kate Bruce as Confederate Mother
 Edward Dillon as John, Confederate Son
 Clara T. Bracy as Union Mother
 Edwin August as John, Union Son
 Dorothy West as Confederate Son's Fiancée
 Lucy Cotton as Union Son's Fiancée
 Jack Mulhall as New Boy Friend

See also
 List of American films of 1910
D. W. Griffith filmography

References

External links

1910 films
1910 short films
1910 drama films
Silent American drama films
American silent short films
American black-and-white films
American Civil War films
Films directed by D. W. Griffith
1910s American films